Yvonne is a female given name.

Yvonne may also refer to:

Yvonne (band), a 1993—2002 Swedish group featuring Henric de la Cour
Yvonne (cow) a German cow that escaped and was missing for several weeks in 2011
Yvonne (musical), a 1926 West End musical

See also
 
 Ivonne, a given name